Planina Donja  is a village-like part of a Zagreb borough in Croatia. 

Populated places in the City of Zagreb